Kilpola is an island 6 x 8 km among the skerries in the northwestern part of the Lake Ladoga, in Lakhdenpokhsky District of Republic of Karelia, connected to the mainland by a bridge. It is composed of granite hills rising up to about 60 m. above sea-level (55 m above the level of the lake) and covered by Scots Pine forest. There are several lakes on the island.

External links
Map of Kilpola
Map of Kilpola
Saarnisto, Matti & Tuulikki Grönlund (1996). Shoreline displacement of Lake Ladoga - new data from Kilpolansaari. Hydrobiologia 322.1-3, 205–215.

Lakhdenpokhsky District
Landforms of the Republic of Karelia
Lake islands of Europe
Karelian Isthmus
Lake islands of Russia